The Best Things In The World is a 2010 Brazilian coming-of-age drama film based on the book series Mano, by Gilberto Dimenstein and Heloísa Prieto. It was directed, written and co-produced by Laís Bodanzky, and stars Francisco Miguez, Gabriela Rocha, Caio Blat, Denise Fraga, and Fiuk.

Plot
The film is set in a middle-class school in São Paulo, and tells the one-month period in the life of Hermano, "Mano". Mano and his brother Pedro lead fun-loving lives until they learn their parents are getting a divorce. The anguish of their parents’ separation becomes more difficult when they discover their father is gay. Deeply affected by the changes at home, Mano must also deal with the challenge of being popular at school, having sex for the first time, the discovery of love and a snooping classmate's destructive gossip blog. The arrival of adulthood brings with it overwhelming difficulties and a major transformation in the way Mano sees the world.

Cast
 Francisco Miguez as Mano
 Gabriela Rocha as Carol
 Caio Blat as Artur
 Paulo Vilhena as Marcelo
 Fiuk as Pedro
 Gustavo Machado as Gustavo
 Zécarlos Machado as Horácio
 Maria Eugênia Cortez as Bruna
 Denise Fraga as Camila
 Anna Sophia Gryschek as Valéria

References

External links
 

2010 films
2010s coming-of-age drama films
2010s teen drama films
Brazilian coming-of-age drama films
Films directed by Laís Bodanzky
Films shot in São Paulo
2010s Portuguese-language films
2010 drama films